STS-38 was a Space Shuttle mission by NASA using the Space Shuttle Atlantis. It was the 37th shuttle mission, and carried a classified payload for the U.S. Department of Defense (DoD). It was the seventh flight for Atlantis and the seventh flight dedicated to the Department of Defense. The mission was a 4-day mission that traveled  and completed 79 revolutions. Atlantis landed at Kennedy Space Center's Shuttle Landing Facility's runway 33. The launch was originally scheduled for July 1990, but was rescheduled due to a hydrogen leak found on  during the STS-35 countdown. During a rollback to the Orbiter Processing Facility Atlantis was damaged during a hail storm. The eventual launch date of November 15, 1990, was set due to a payload problem. The launch window was between 18:30 and 22:30 EST. The launch occurred at 18:48:13 EST.

Crew

Crew seating arrangements

Preparations and launch 
The launch occurred on November 15, 1990, 18:48:13 EST. It was originally scheduled for July 9, 1990, however, a liquid hydrogen leak found on Columbia during the STS-35 countdown prompted three precautionary tanking tests on Atlantis at the pad on June 29, 1990, on July 13, and on July 25, 1990. Tests confirmed the hydrogen fuel leak on the external tank side of the external tank/orbiter  quick disconnect umbilical. This could not be repaired at the pad and Atlantis was rolled back to the VAB on August 9, 1990, demated, then transferred to the Orbiter Processing Facility (OPF). During rollback, the vehicle remained parked outside the VAB for about a day while the Columbia/STS-35 stack was transferred to the pad for launch. While outside, Atlantis suffered minor hail damage to its tiles during a thunderstorm. After repairs were made in the OPF, Atlantis was transferred to the VAB for mating on October 2, 1990. During hoisting operations, the platform beam that was to have been removed from the orbiter's aft compartment fell and caused minor damage, which was repaired. The vehicle rolled out to Pad A on October 12, 1990. The fourth mini-tanking test was performed on October 24, 1990, with no excessive hydrogen or oxygen leakage detected. During the Flight Readiness Review (FRR), the launch date was set for November 9, 1990. The launch was reset for November 15 due to payload problems. Liftoff occurred during a classified launch window lying within a launch period extending from 18:30 to 22:30 EST on November 15, 1990.

Classified payload 
According to Aviation Week, the shuttle initially entered a  x  orbit at an inclination of 28.45° to the equator. It then executed three orbital maneuvering system (OMS) burns, the last on orbit #4.

The first classified payload was code-named USA-67, which was deployed from Atlantis' cargo bay on the seventh orbit and ignited its rocket motor at the ascending node of the eighth orbit to place it in a geostationary transfer orbit (GTO). Aviation Week reported that USA-67 was a secret ELINT gathering satellite headed for geosynchronous orbit and launched to monitor the events during the first Gulf War in 1990. As a result of there being two upper stages aboard STS-38, USA-67 was originally believed to be a Magnum satellite like those  deployed on STS-51-C and STS-33, which were launched via a two-stage Inertial Upper Stage (IUS). Today it is believed that USA-67 was instead a secret Satellite Data System (SDS-2) military communications satellite, like those deployed on STS-28 and STS-53.

It is also believed that USA-67 was not the only satellite deployed during STS-38. A publicly released image of Atlantis''' vertical stabilizer and upper aft bulkhead, similar to the one released from STS-53, confirms that the ASE (Airborne Support Equipment) for the Inertial Upper Stage (IUS) was absent from this flight. An explanation is that two separate satellites were deployed, using single-stage Payload Assist Module (PAM-D). Rumors that appear to have been substantiated by the identification of an "unknown" geostationary satellite by amateur observersTed Molczan, satobs.org: Evaluation of the opportunity to launch Prowler on STS-38 insist that the second payload was a stealth satellite known as Prowler, reportedly intended to covertly inspect other nation's geostationary satellites.

 Landing 
The mission was extended by one day due to unacceptable crosswinds at the original planned landing site of Edwards Air Force Base. Continued adverse conditions led to a decision to shift the landing to KSC. Landing occurred on November 20, 1990, 16:42:42 EST, Runway 33, at the Kennedy Space Center. STS-38 marked the first KSC landing for Atlantis, and the first shuttle landing at KSC since April 1985 (the last being STS-51-D).

Gallery

See also 

 List of human spaceflights
 List of Space Shuttle missions
 Outline of space science
 Space Shuttle

References

External links 
 NASA mission summary 
 STS-38 Video Highlights 
 Astronatix: STS-38

Space Shuttle missions
Spacecraft launched in 1990
Department of Defense Space Shuttle missions